William Bennett Chester was a Church of Ireland bishop and author. Educated at Trinity College, Dublin, he was ordained in 1848. After a curacy in Kilrush he held incumbencies at Killead, Kilkee, Ballymackey, Nenagh and Birr. He was Chancellor then Archdeacon of Killaloe before his elevation to the episcopate in 1884. He died in post on 27 August 1893.

References

Alumni of Trinity College Dublin
Archdeacons of Killaloe
19th-century Anglican bishops in Ireland
Bishops of Killaloe and Clonfert
1893 deaths
Year of birth missing